, real name , was a Japanese actress. She appeared in multiple films between 1957 and 1974, such as Sanjuro and Red Beard. She retired in 1974, coming back briefly from the late 1980s to 1990 to support her son, Yuta Dan (1967–2006), who was also an actor.

Partial filmography

References

1935 births
2003 deaths
Japanese actresses